José Ángel Nápoles (April 13, 1940 – August 16, 2019) was a Cuban-born Mexican professional boxer. He was a two-time undisputed welterweight champion, having held the WBA, WBC, and The Ring welterweight titles between 1969 to 1975. He is frequently ranked as one of the greatest fighters of all time in that division and is a member of the International Boxing Hall of Fame. His record of the most wins in unified championship bouts in boxing history, shared with Muhammad Ali, was unbeaten for 40 years. After debuting professionally in Cuba, he fought out of Mexico and became a Mexican citizen.

Mexico

Nápoles debuted as a professional boxer on August 2, 1958 in Cuba, knocking out Julio Rojas in the first round. Nápoles' first 21 bouts were in Cuba, against mostly unknown competition. He did beat Ángel García and Leslie Grant, but lost to Hilton Smith (in his first defeat).

After beating Enrique Carabeo in March 1961, Nápoles found himself a new challenge, outside of the ring; Cuban president Fidel Castro banned professional boxing in Cuba, and Nápoles soon found his career in jeopardy.

He found asylum in Mexico, where he soon found himself back inside the ring, beating Enrique Camarena by a knockout in two rounds on July 21, 1962. He won all four of his fights that year.

In 1963, he won seven bouts and lost two. He was defeated by Tony Perez and Alfredo Urbina, both by decision, but he beat JC Morgan, by knockout in seven rounds, in Venezuela.

1964 was a successful year for Nápoles. He travelled to Japan, where he beat Taketeru Yoshimoto by knockout in round one, and he beat future world champion Carlos Morocho Hernández by knockout in round seven, this time back in Venezuela. In addition to those wins, he avenged his loss to Urbina by knocking him out twice, the first time in the first round and the second time in the third.

He won three more fights in 1965, including another win against Morgan, before seeing a raise in opposition quality when he faced the former world Junior Welterweight champion Eddie Perkins, beating him by decision in ten rounds. For his next fight, he met his own future world title challenger, Adolph Pruitt, beating him by knockout in round three.

In 1966, he won five fights, all by knockout, and lost one, to arch-rival Morgan, who knocked him out in round four. This would be his last loss in four years.

Welterweight champion
Nápoles began a streak of 20 wins in a row, 13 of them before challenging for the world's welterweight title. These included avenging the loss to Morgan with a two-round knockout. During this period, Nápoles also became a fan favorite in southern California, and, after beating Fate Davis, on February 15 of 1969 in Mexico, he was given an opportunity to win the world championship when he faced the current champion Curtis Cokes in Inglewood, on April 18. Nápoles beat Cokes by a knockout in round 13 to become world welterweight champion, and, as was becoming common place for him, he wore a sombrero after the fight. On June 29, he retained the title in a rematch with Cokes by a knockout in round 10 in his hometown of Mexico City, and on October 12, he outpointed former world champion Emile Griffith in 15, also retaining the title.

Loss of title
Nápoles began the 1970s, by defeating Ernie "Indian Red" Lopez by a knockout in round 15 in front of an audience that included former world champion Sugar Ray Robinson on February 14, 1970. But after winning two non-title bouts, he suffered an upset when he was stopped due to being cut in four rounds by Carmen Basilio's nephew Billy Backus, who took the world's Welterweight title from Nápoles on December 3 at Syracuse.

Regaining the title
After winning one more fight, he and Backus fought again, for the world welterweight title now in Backus' hands.  This time, it was held in Los Angeles, and Nápoles recovered the world championship via an 8th round stoppage.  After three non-title wins, including one over Jean Josselin, he faced Hedgemon Lewis on December 14, retaining the world title with a decision in 15 rounds, but Nápoles' training habits were suffering; he was alleged to be coming into the gym stinking of alcohol with an attitude towards his seconds.

In 1972, he retained the title knocking out Ralph Charles in seven in England, and then, Pruitt resurfaced again, this time with the world Welterweight title on the line. Nápoles retained his crown by knockout in round two.

World traveller Nápoles began 1973 by retaining the title against Lopez again, by knockout in seven, then he visited Grenoble, France, where he retained the crown with a 15-round decision over Roger Menetrey, and Toronto, Ontario, Canada where he beat Clyde Gray, once again retaining the world title with a 15-round decision.

Middleweight

After this, many boxing fans were asking for a fight between Nápoles and World Middleweight Champion Carlos Monzón. The fight was made possible when Nápoles moved in weight to challenge Monzon for Monzon's title, so the two dueled on February 9, 1974 at a parking lot in Paris. This would be Nápoles' only bout at the Middleweight division, as he was defeated by quitting the match. Nápoles then went back to the Welterweight division, and retained the title twice before the year ended, with a knockout in nine over Lewis, and with a knockout in three over Horacio Saldaño.

In 1975, Nápoles had two wins over Armando Muniz, both times to retain his world title. The first time, a technical decision win in 12 rounds at Acapulco was a controversial win, so a return match was fought in Los Angeles, where Nápoles prevailed by decision.

Retirement
On December 6 of that year, however, Nápoles lost his title to British boxing teacher John H. Stracey, who won over Nápoles by a technical knockout in round six at Mexico City despite being floored by Nápoles in round one. After this fight, Nápoles announced his retirement. Remarkably, he was able to stay away from the temptation of a comeback, much like Marvin Hagler.

Nápoles had a final record of 81 wins and 7 losses, with 54 wins by knockout, which makes him a member of the exclusive group of boxers that won 50 or more fights by knockout in their careers.

Personal life
Napoles was the son of Pedro Napoles, a schoolteacher, and his wife Rosa. He had a brother, Pedro Napoles Jr. had nine children. He resided in Ciudad Juarez, Chihuahua, Mexico with his wife Bertha.

Napoles co-starred with superstar Santo in a 1974 Mexican wrestler/horror film called Santo en la venganza de la llorona, aka Santo and Mantequilla Napoles in the Revenge of the Crying Woman.

Death
Nápoles died on August 16, 2019 in Mexico City after a long-illness at the age of 79.

Honours
In 1985, Nápoles was inducted into The Ring boxing hall of fame, and in 1990 into the International Boxing Hall of Fame.

Professional boxing record

See also
List of world welterweight boxing champions
List of Mexican boxing world champions

References

External links

https://titlehistories.com/boxing/na/usa/ny/nysac-wl.html

 

1940 births
2019 deaths
Sportspeople from Santiago de Cuba
Cuban male boxers
Mexican male boxers
Cuban emigrants to Mexico
Cuban people of African descent
International Boxing Hall of Fame inductees
Welterweight boxers
Middleweight boxers
World Boxing Association champions
World Boxing Council champions
The Ring (magazine) champions
World welterweight boxing champions